İste (Ask for It) is the second Maxi Single (EP/hybrid album) released in 2004 of the Turkish pop singer Mustafa Sandal.

Track listing

Credits
 Music direction, arrangements: Mustafa Sandal, Özgür Yedievli, Emre Irmak, Bülent Aris
 Mixing: Serkan Kula, Bülent Aris, Serdar Ağırlı
 Publishing: Yada Music
 Photography: Zeynel Abidin

Music videos
 "İsyankar" (This song had two music videos, one for the original version and one for the Beathoavenz Cut version featuring Gentleman)
 "Kavrulduk"
 "Gel Aşkım"
 "All My Life"

Controversy 
The song "İsyankar" was believed to plagiarize parts from an older Punjabi MC song. However, this was never tracked and in 2005 Mustafa Sandal recorded a remix version of the song featuring Punjabi MC

Notes

References

Mustafa Sandal albums
2004 albums